The rusty skink (Madascincus macrolepis) is an extant species of skink, a lizard in the family Scincidae. The species is endemic to Madagascar.

References

Madascincus
Reptiles described in 1888
Reptiles of Madagascar
Endemic fauna of Madagascar
Taxa named by George Albert Boulenger